The 1973 Madison Dukes football team was an American football team that represented Madison College (now known as James Madison University) during the 1973 NCAA Division III football season as an independent. Led by second-year head coach Challace McMillin, the Dukes compiled a record of 4–5.

Schedule

References

Madison
James Madison Dukes football seasons
Madison Dukes football